Aycart (or Aicart) del Fossat (fl. 1250–68) was a troubadour from Le Fossat in Ariège. To him are attributed one sirventes and a partimen with Girard Cavalaz.

The sirventes is about the victory of Charles of Anjou over Conradin at the Battle of Tagliacozzo (1268). The partimen, "Si paradis et enfernz son aital", is a dilemma on the nature of Heaven and Hell (c. 1250). The debaters are known only as Aicart and Girart, but they have long been identified with Aycart and Girard. The partimen is preserved in a manuscript from Bergamo, where it has a Latin razo.

Further reading
Bastard, Antoine de. "Aicart del Fossat et les événements politiques en Italie (1268)." Mélanges de philologie romane dédiés à la mémoire de Jean Boutière (1899–1967), 1:51–75 (Liège, 1971).
Bertoni, Giulio. "Un nuovo trovatore italiano: Girardo Cavallazzi." Romania, 43:587–593 (1914).
Gresti, Paolo. "Un nuovo trovatore italiano? Osservazioni sul partimen tra Aycard de Fossat e Girard Cavalaz, Si paradis et enfernz son aital (BdT 6A.1)", p. 341–354. Il genere ‹tenzone› nelle letterature romanze delle Origini. Atti del convegno internazionale, Lausanne, 13–15 November 1997, edd. M. Pedroni and A. Stäuble. Ravenna, 1999.

Works
Si paradis et enfernz son aital at Rialto

13th-century French troubadours
Year of death unknown
Year of birth unknown
People from Ariège (department)